Richard Greville Verney, 19th Baron Willoughby de Broke (29 March 1869 (London) – 16 December 1923) was a British peer and conservative politician.

Life
Verney was the son of Colonel Henry Verney, 18th Baron Willoughby de Broke and Geraldine Smith-Barry and educated at Eton College and New College, Oxford. He married Marie Frances Lisette Hanbury, daughter of Charles Addington Hanbury, on 2 July 1895. They had one son, John Henry Peyto Verney, who succeeded him as 20th Baron Willoughby de Broke.

The historian George Dangerfield described Verney as "a genial and sporting young peer, whose face bore a pleasing resemblance to the horse. ... He had quite a gift for writing, thought clearly, and was not more than two hundred years behind his time." He wrote a book on foxhunting called "Hunting the Fox", which was published in 1921.

Verney represented Rugby, Warwickshire as an MP from 1895–1900. In 1902 he succeeded his father as 19th Baron Willoughby de Broke and is considered to have succeeded as de jure 26th and 27th Baron Latimer of Corby but did not claim those titles. In the House of Lords, he and Hardinge Giffard, 1st Earl of Halsbury led the "Die-Hards" or Ditchers in opposition to the Parliament Act 1911.

In 1921, Verney sold the family seat, Compton Verney House, to Joseph Watson (d. 1922), a soap manufacturer from Leeds, who was elevated to the peerage in 1922 as 1st Baron Manton of Compton Verney. He retained an estate cottage in Kineton called Fox Cottage, which became his country residence. Upon his death, on 16 December 1923, his title passed to his son, John Henry Peyto Verney.

His autobiography, The Passing Years, was published posthumously in 1924. According to P. J. Waller, the book is "rightly valued for the picture they present of county society. They colour for historians an otherwise empty abstraction, the deferential community, and divest it of unnecessarily scornful associations of the hubristic and menial kind." M. K. Ashby wrote that "in the whole volume of The Passing Years there is not one metaphor which is not drawn from sport or game or weather or the table."

References

Publications
 Lord Willoughby de Broke, 'The Tory Tradition', National Review (October, 1911), pp. 201–13.
 Lord Willoughby de Broke, The Passing Years (London: Constable, 1924).
 Richard Greville Verney, Lord Willoughby de Broke. Hunting the Fox  (Houghton Mifflin Co, 1921)

Further reading
 Gregory D. Phillips, 'Lord Willoughby de Broke and the Politics of Radical Toryism, 1909-1914', The Journal of British Studies, Vol. 20, No. 1 (Autumn, 1980), pp. 205–224.
 Thomas C. Kennedy, 'Tory radicalism and the home rule crisis, 1910–1914: The case of Lord Willoughby de Broke', Canadian Journal of History, April 2002.
 R. Bearman, 'Compton Verney: A History of the House and its Owners' (Shakespeare Birthplace Trust, 2000, pp. 157–74).

External links
 
 Compton Verney House website
Parliamentary Archives, Papers of Richard Greville Verney, 19th Lord Willoughby de Broke

1869 births
1923 deaths
Politicians from London
People educated at Eton College
Alumni of New College, Oxford
Conservative Party (UK) MPs for English constituencies
Masters of foxhounds in England
UK MPs 1895–1900
UK MPs who inherited peerages
Richard
19